The Imago Film Festival is a film festival that takes place annually in the state of Illinois, United States. It is usually in April on the Judson University campus. The mission statement indicates: "The Imago Film Festival showcases independent film that deals with faith issues, emphasizing image and story. The festival films capture the full spectrum of human emotion, experience, and spirituality."

History
The Imago Film Festival was developed in 2005 to showcase films made by students at Judson University. Impressed by the reception of the one-night event, professors Dr. Terrence Wandtke and Darren Wilson expanded the festival to a five-day event in 2006 and invited submissions from outside the school.

The festival explores the connections between faith and film. In addition to screening independent short films from around the world, the festival features critics and filmmakers discussing the intersections of art, culture, and religion. The festival is supported by individual donors, corporate sponsors, and the Judson Student Organization.

Speakers have included: Jim Wall, senior corresponding editor of The Christian Century (2006); Phil Vischer, creator of Veggie Tales and Robert K. Johnston, author of Reel Spirituality (2007); Stephen Vidano, director of Star of Bethlehem and David Dark, author of The Sacredness of Questioning Everything (2008); David McFadzean, creator of Home Improvement and William Romanowski, author of Eyes Wide Open (2009); Darren Wilson, director of Furious Love and Gaye Williams Ortiz, author of Theology and Film (2010); David Nixon, producer/director of To Write Love on Her Arms and Jeffrey Overstreet, author of Through a Screen Darkly (2011); Brooks Douglass, writer of Heaven's Rain and Steve Taylor, producer/director of Blue Like Jazz (2012); Ralph Winter, producer of Star Trek and X-Men films and Dean Batali, writer for That '70s Show (2013); Ron Dean, actor in The Fugitive and The Dark Knight and Marshall Allman, actor in True Blood and Blue Like Jazz (2014); Doug Jones, actor in Pan's Labyrinth, Hellboy, and Falling Skies and Will Bakke, director of Believe Me (2015); Joshua Weigel, director of "The Butterfly Circus" and Matthew Luhn, story artist for Toy Story, Finding Nemo, and Monsters, Inc. (2016); Rich Peluso, senior vice president of Affirm Films and Eric Groth, producer of Full of Grace (2017).

The Imago Lifetime Achievement Award was inaugurated in the festival's tenth year to recognize filmmakers whose work contributes to the discussion of issues of faith and ethics.  The award recipients have included: Martin Sheen (2014), Denzel Washington (2015), Ralph Winter (2016), and David McFadzean (2017).

Awards
2005 
 Best in Show: “The Money Tree”—Ryan Lawrence

2006 
 Best of Show: “Anniversary”—Greg Hargis 
 1-10 Minutes: “Lift”—Terri Sarris 
 11-20 Minutes: “The Kinkade Code”—Matt Bilen 
 Audience Choice: “Pillowfight”—Scott Rice

2007 
 Best of Show: “Jaded”—Anders Lindwall 
 1-10 Minutes: “Redemption”—Sharise Holt 
 11-20 Minutes: “Crown of the Forest”—Brain Walton 
 Audience Choice: “Mind’s Eye”—Matt Bilen

2008 
 Best in Show: “Holding”—Thomas Bradson 
 1-15 Minutes: “Dependence”—Tamara Shaya 
 16-30 Minutes: “The Noble Lie”—Mitch Lusas 
 Audience Choice: “Abigail”—Lauran Holton

2009 
 Best in Show: “Gaining Ground”—Marc Brummund 
 1-15 Minutes: “Arc of a Bird”—Hugh Sculze 
 16-30 Minutes: “The Prodigal Trilogy”—Tad Munnings 
 Audience Choice: “Somebody’s Baby”—Garrett Marks

2010 
 Best in Show: “Jitensha”—Paul Nethercott 
 1-15 Minutes: “Prayers for Peace”—Justin Grella 
 16-30 Minutes: “A Mysterious Way”—Phil Warner 
 Audience Choice: “More than Walking”—Jonathan Sigworth

2011
 Best in Show: "Kavi"—Gregg Halvey
 1-15 Minutes: "Afghan"—Pardis Parker
 16-30 Minutes: "Rita"—Antonio Piazza
 Audience Choice: "LastRain"—Tony Lopez

2012
 Best in Show: "When Cotton Blossoms"—Scott Magie
 1-15 Minutes: "The Cortege"—Marina Sereseky
 16-30 Minutes: "Mato Oput"—Tim Guthrie
 Audience Choice: "The Dance"—Pardis Parker

2013
 Best in Show: "Wednesday's Child"—Rocco Cataldo
 1-15 Minutes: "The Discarded"—David Delicado Adsuar
 16-30 Minutes: "Stalled"—Shannon Kohli
 Audience Choice: "Smile"—Matteo Pianezzi and "The Apple of My Eye"—Josecho de Linares

2014
 Best in Show: "Not Anymore: A Story of Revolution"-Matthew VanDyke
 Shorter time frame: "Ngutu"-Felipe del Olmo, Daniel Valledor
 Longer time frame: "The Uneducated"-Craig Rutherford
 Audience Choice: "The Advocate"-Sean Taylor, Kyla Martin

2015
 Best in Show: "Lila"-Carlos Lascano
 1st Runner Up: "Somewhere Between Freedom and Protection, Kansas"-Patrick Clement
 2nd Runner Up: "The Unclean"-Bahram Ark
 Audience Choice: "Love at First Sight"-Mark Playne

2016
 Best in Show: "We Can't Live Without Cosmos"-Konstantin Bronzit
 1st Runner Up: "Persimmon"-Dean Yamada
 2nd Runner Up: "Speed Dating"-Meghann Artes
 Audience Choice: "Not the End"-Cesar Esteban Alenda & Jose Esteban Alenda

2017
 Best in Show: "My Life I Don't Want"-Nyan Kyal Say
 1st Runner Up: "Red Light"-Toma Waszarow
 2nd Runner Up: "Tiny's New Home"-Justin Hayward
 Audience Choice tie: "The Chop"-Lewis Rose
 Audience Choice tie: "Darrel"-Marc Briones Piulachs

See also
 List of film festivals

External links
 Imago Film Festival

Film festivals in Illinois
2005 establishments in Illinois
Judson University
Elgin, Illinois